is a toll road in Hiroshima Prefecture. It is owned and operated by the West Nippon Expressway Company (NEXCO West Japan). The route is signed E31 under Ministry of Land, Infrastructure, Transport and Tourism's  "2016 Proposal for Realization of Expressway Numbering."

Junction list
The entire expressway is in Hiroshima Prefecture. PA - parking area,  TB - toll gate

See also

Japan National Route 31

References

External links
 West Nippon Expressway Company

Toll roads in Japan
Roads in Hiroshima Prefecture